The Glas Isar is a small two door four seater car produced by  Hans Glas GmbH at their Dingolfing plant.   The car was first presented as the Goggomobil T600 in September 1957 at the Frankfurt Motor Show, with volume production starting in August 1958.

Initially Glas described it simply as a "big Goggomobil", but in autumn 1959 it was rebranded as the Glas Isar.   At the same time a kombi (estate car) version joined the range.  A minor facelift occurred in August 1960 and the Isar continued in production until the end of Summer 1965.

Origins
The car that appeared at the 1957 Frankfurt Motor Show was a prototype which in the event differed significantly from the car that entered production the next year, in that it used front wheel drive.   In most other respects, notably regarding the two cylinder boxer engine and the overall shape of the car, only minor stylistic changes differentiated the cars that went into production in 1958 from the 1957 prototypes.

The front wheel drive prototype was unstable, however, because of the way the engine was set far ahead of the front axle, and high above the front-wheel drive power train,  in what was a relatively light weight car.   Setting the engine further back in relation to the front wheels would have involved a level of re-engineering for which neither time nor money were available.   The decision was therefore taken to switch to a rear wheel drive configuration.   The late decision led to issues with the gear box, however, which could not be redesigned at this stage and was simply switched round to allow for the fact that the drive shaft pointed in the opposite direction to that previously envisaged.  For the driver, this gave rise to a back to front gear change, with first and third speed gear level positions nearer the driver and second and fourth positions facing the front of the car.

The late switch to rear wheel drive threatened to reduce luggage space while freeing up space under the bonnet/hood above the low profile boxer engines, and the manufacturer took the opportunity to reposition the spare wheel to a location under the bonnet/hoot in a cradle above the engine.

Goggomobil T 600
Series production of the Goggomobil T600 began on 12 June 1958.   The new two door four seater incorporated several then fashionable transatlantic styling features including an eye-catching wrap-around windscreen, small tailfins and a two-tone paint finish.   The tail lights followed the approximate silhouette of a small key and were said to resemble those on the stylish Opel Kapitän.

Still at this time considered advanced was the car's monocoque steel bodied construction (without a separate chassis), the rigidity of which was enhanced in 1959 through the addition of reinforcing box section lengths on each side of the floor section.   The front wheels were independently sprung and the rear suspension followed the usual pattern of the time, combining a rigid rear axle with leaf springing.

The 584 cc boxer motor developed a maximum power output of 15 kW (20 PS) at 5,000 rpm, which provided for a top speed of 98 km/h (61 mph).

Unusually in an economy car of the period, the T600 incorporated a 12 volt electrical system at a time when the contemporary Volkswagens and German Fords would still come with a 6 volt systems for another ten years.

Goggomobil T 700
By the time volume production commenced in August 1958, the T600 had been joined by the more powerful T700.   In this car the 688 cc boxer motor developed a maximum power output of 22 kW (30 PS) at 4,900 rpm, which provided for a top speed of 110 km/h (69 mph) and reduced by a third the acceleration time to 100 kmh (62 mph).

Name change and range expansion
In order to distance the model from the smaller and more minimalist Goggomobil, and possibly also to try and distract  from reliability and structural problems that afflicted early cars, November 1959 saw a name change.  The "Goggomobil T600" became the "Glas Isar T600" and the "Goggomobil T700" became the "Glas Isar T700".   In the manufacturer's Lower Bavarian homeland the River Isar is the principal river and would have enjoyed a warm resonance with customers, though subsequently, as the company began to implement an export strategy, it was found that customers in some non-German speaking countries thought the name "Isar" sounded "funny" and cars exported to these markets were branded as the "Glas Isard" which presumably sounded less "funny" . Isard is the vernacular name for a variant of Chamois living in the Pyrénées,known as a fast runner and agile climber, making it a difficult target for hunters. The Glas Isard cars marketed in continental Europe sported a stylized Isard on the sales leaflets and sometimes as an additional badge on the bodywork.

The name change was accompanied by the appearance of a 3-door station wagon variant which was branded as the  "Glas Isar K600" or "Glas Isar K700  according to engine size.

Teething troubles
Early "big Goggomobils" suffered from serious reliability issues, suggesting an excessively rushed development schedule.   The aluminium castings that formed the motor housings deformed at high operating temperatures leading to a doubling of the fuel consumption.   Even more alarmingly, until the manufacturer inserted extra strengthening sections under the floor, the body flexed on bumpy roads so much that small cracks appeared and, in extreme cases, the panoramic windscreen popped out of its frame.   Teething troubles on the early T600 and T700 models burdened the manufacturer with high warranty costs and severely damaged the reputation of Glas cars in the market place.

Facelift
The only significant facelift was revealed in August 1960.   The cars grew an extra 25 mm (1 inch) in length, apparently to accommodate the slightly more prominent rear lights.   The option of chrome plated bumpers was added in order to comply with new construction regulations in the US. The rear lights were still vertically mounted on the corners of the car underneath little tail fins, but they now became larger and took on a rectangular shape, simpler than hitherto.   The rear bumper was reshaped to accommodate the larger lights and the handle for the boot/ trunk lid was repositioned, along with the light that illuminated the rear license plate.   The rear roof was reshaped to allow for a much larger rear window which followed contemporary styling trends and expanded the view out.

Buyers of the smaller engined Isar T600 saw the claimed maximum power output reduced from to 15 kW (20 PS) to, 14 kW (19 PS).   Curiously the claimed maximum speed of the T600 nevertheless increased to 105 km/h (65 mph).   In September 1959 the design of the carburetor had been changed and the supplier switched from Bing to Solex.   In 1960, possibly reflecting the increasing minimum octane levels of available fuels, the compression ratio was raised slightly, and the reduction in claimed power also coincided with one of the two changes to the lower gear ratios implemented during the car's life.

There was no significant facelift between 1960 and 1965, but towards the end of the production run the car acquired a black synthetic leather covering on the dashboard.  In the final cars the Isar's original seats and steering wheel were replaced by those from the newer and slightly larger Glas 1004.

Production
Between 1958 and 1965 Glas produced 73,311 Isar saloons and, between 1959 and 1965  a further 14,274 Isar kombis.    57% of the saloons and 88% of the kombis were delivered with the larger 688 cc engine. .

Between 1960 and 1965 the Isar was also built (badged as the Isard) at the company's plant in Argentina where it is remembered as one of the most popular cars of the 1960s.

Sources and further reading
Rosellen, Hanns-Peter: Vom Goggomobil zum Glas V8, Zyklam-Verlag Frankfurt (1985), 

This entry includes information from the German Wikipedia Glas Isar article.

Sedans
1960s cars
Cars introduced in 1957
Isar
Rear-wheel-drive vehicles
Cars powered by boxer engines